Het uur tussen hond en wolf is a novel by Dutch author Maarten 't Hart. It was first published in 1987.

Novels by Maarten 't Hart
1987 novels